Zabihallah also spelled Zabihullah, Zabihollah or Dhabihallah  is a Muslim name occurring for the most part throughout the Persian influenced Islamic world, translating to "Sacrifice of God."

Given Names

 Zabihollah Safa (born 1911), Iranian Scholar
 Zabihollah Rezaee (born 1954), Iranian Accountant
, Iranian Politician
 Zabihullah Mujahid (born 1978), Afghan Taliban Spokesman
 Zabihollah Poursheib (born 1988), Iranian Athlete

See Also
 List of Arabic theophoric names

Arabic masculine given names